Nekrasov, also Nekrassov, or Nekrasova (feminine; Некра́сова), is a Russian surname. Notable people with the surname include:

Aleksandr Nekrasov (1883–1957), Russian mathematician and academician
Alexander Nekrasov (sergeant) (1925–1944), Soviet army officer and Hero of the Soviet Union
Alexander Nekrassov, Voice of Russia news correspondent in London
Andrei Nekrasov (born 1958), contemporary Russian filmmaker from St. Petersburg
Andrei Sergeevich Nekrasov (1907-1987), Soviet writer
Andrey Nekrasov (sergeant) (1909–1993), Soviet army officer and Hero of the Soviet Union
Boris Nekrasov (1899-?), Soviet chemist
Dasha Nekrasova (born 1991) A Belarusian-American actress, filmmaker and podcaster.
Ignat Nekrasov (c.1660-1737), original leader of Nekrasovites (Nekrasov Cossacks) 
Ivan Nekrasov (1892–1964), Soviet army officer and Hero of the Soviet Union
Leopold Nekrasov (1923–1945), Soviet army officer and Hero of the Soviet Union
Nikita Nekrasov (1973- ), Russian-French theoretical and mathematical physicist
Nikolay Nekrasov (1821–1878), Russian poet
Nikolay Nikolayevich Nekrasov (1906-?), Soviet economist and academician
Nikolai Vissarionovich Nekrasov (1879–1940), Russian politician
Nikolai Vladimirovich Nekrasov (1900–1938), Soviet journalist and esperantist
Pavel Nekrasov (1853–1924), Russian mathematician
Viktor Nekrasov (1911–1987), Soviet writer
Vladislav Pavlovich Nekrasov (1926–2007), Sergeant, Hero of Soviet Union
Vsevolod Nekrasov  (1934–2009), Russian poet

See also
2907 Nekrasov, an asteroid
Nekrasovka

Russian-language surnames